The United States competed at the 1972 Summer Olympics in Munich, West Germany. 400 competitors, 316 men and 84 women, took part in 185 events in 21 sports.

Medalists
The United States finished in second position in the final medal rankings, with 33 gold and 94 total medals.

Gold

 Doreen Wilber — Archery, Women's Individual Competition
 John Williams — Archery, Men's Individual Competition
 Vincent Matthews — Athletics, Men's 400 metres
 Dave Wottle — Athletics, Men's 800 metres
 Frank Shorter — Athletics, Men's Marathon
 Rod Milburn — Athletics, Men's 110 m Hurdles
 Larry Black, Eddie Hart, Robert Taylor, and Gerald Tinker — Athletics, Men's 4 × 100 m Relay
 Randy Williams — Athletics, Men's Long Jump
 Ray Seales — Boxing, Men's Light Welterweight
 Maxine Joyce King — Diving, Women's 3 m Springboard
 John Writer — Shooting, Men's Small-bore Rifle, Three Positions
 Lones Wigger — Shooting, Men's Free Rifle, Three Positions
 Mark Spitz — Swimming, Men's 100 m Freestyle
 Mark Spitz — Swimming, Men's 200 m Freestyle
 Mark Spitz — Swimming, Men's 100 m Butterfly
 Mark Spitz — Swimming, Men's 200 m Butterfly
 Mike Burton — Swimming, Men's 1500 m Freestyle
 John Hencken — Swimming, Men's 200 m Breaststroke
 David Edgar, Jerry Heidenreich, John Murphy, and Mark Spitz — Swimming, Men's 4 × 100 m Freestyle Relay
 Steve Genter, John Kinsella, Fred Tyler, and Mark Spitz — Swimming, Men's 4 × 200 m Freestyle Relay
 Tom Bruce, Jerry Heidenreich, Mike Stamm, and Mark Spitz — Swimming, Men's 4 × 100 m Medley Relay
 Sandy Neilson — Swimming, Women's 100 m Freestyle
 Keena Rothhammer — Swimming, Women's 800 m Freestyle
 Melissa Belote — Swimming, Women's 100 m Backstroke
 Melissa Belote — Swimming, Women's 200 m Backstroke
 Cathy Carr — Swimming, Women's 100 m Breaststroke
 Karen Moe — Swimming, Women's 200 m Butterfly
 Shirley Babashoff, Jane Barkman, Jenny Kemp, and Sandy Neilson — Swimming, Women's 4 × 100 m Freestyle Relay
 Melissa Belote, Cathy Carr, Deena Deardurff, and Sandy Neilson — Swimming, Women's 4 × 100 m Medley Relay
 Dan Gable — Wrestling, Men's Freestyle Lightweight
 Wayne Wells — Wrestling, Men's Freestyle Welterweight
 Ben Peterson — Wrestling, Men's Freestyle Light Heavyweight
 William Allen, William Bentsen, and Harry Melges — Sailing, Men's Soling Team Competition

Silver

 Robert Taylor — Athletics, Men's 100 metres
 Wayne Collett — Athletics, Men's 400 meters
 Ralph Mann — Athletics, Men's 400 m Hurdles
 Bob Seagren — Athletics, Men's Pole Vault
 George Woods — Athletics, Men's Shot Put
 Jay Silvester — Athletics, Men's Discus Throw
 Mable Fergerson, Kathy Hammond, Madeline Manning-Jackson, and Cheryl Toussaint — Athletics, Women's 4 × 400 m Relay
 Michael Bantom, James Brewer, Tommy Burleson, Doug Collins, Kenneth Davis, James Forbes, Thomas Henderson, Dwight Jones, Robert Jones, Kevin Joyce, Tom McMillen, and Edward Ratleff — Basketball, Men's Team Competition
 Richard Rydze — Diving, Men's 10 m Platform
 Bruce Davidson, Kevin Freeman, Michael Plumb, and James Wofford — Equestrian, Three-Day Event Team Competition
 Frank Chapot, Kathryn Kusner, Neal Shapiro, and William Steinkraus — Equestrian, Jumping Team Competition
 Gene Clapp, Fritz Hobbs, Bill Hobbs, Paul Hoffman, John Livingston, Michael Livingston, Tim Mickelson, Pete Raymond and Lawrence Terry — Rowing, Men's Eights
 Victor Auer — Shooting, Men's Small-bore Rifle, prone
 Lanny Bassham — Shooting, Men's Small-bore Rifle, Three Positions
 Jerry Heidenreich — Swimming, Men's 100 m Freestyle
 Steve Genter — Swimming, Men's 200 m Freestyle
 Steve Genter — Swimming, Men's 400 m Freestyle
 Mike Stamm — Swimming, Men's 100 m Backstroke
 Mike Stamm — Swimming, Men's 200 m Backstroke
 Tom Bruce — Swimming, Men's 100 m Breaststroke
 Gary Hall, Sr. — Swimming, Men's 200 m Butterfly
 Tim McKee — Swimming, Men's 200 m Individual Medley
 Tim McKee — Swimming, Men's 400 m Individual Medley
 Shirley Babashoff — Swimming, Women's 100 m Freestyle
 Shirley Babashoff — Swimming, Women's 200 m Freestyle
 Susie Atwood — Swimming, Women's 200 m Backstroke
 Dana Schoenfield — Swimming, Women's 200 m Breaststroke
 Lynn Colella — Swimming, Women's 200 m Butterfly
 Richard Sanders — Wrestling, Men's Freestyle Bantamweight
 John Peterson — Wrestling, Men's Freestyle Middleweight

Bronze

 Craig Lincoln — Diving, Men's 3 m Springboard
 Thomas Hill — Athletics, Men's 110 m Hurdles
 Larry Young — Athletics, Men's 50 km Walk
 Dwight Stones — Athletics, Men's High Jump
 Jan Johnson — Athletics, Men's Pole Vault
 Arnie Robinson — Athletics, Men's Long Jump
 Bill Schmidt — Athletics, Men's Javelin Throw
 Kathy Hammond — Athletics, Women's 400 metres
 Kathy Schmidt — Athletics, Women's Javelin Throw
 Ricardo Carreras — Boxing, Men's Bantamweight
 Jesse Valdez — Boxing, Men's Welterweight
 Marvin Johnson — Boxing, Men's Middleweight
 Jamie McEwan — Canoeing, Men's C1 Canadian Slalom Singles
 Neal Shapiro — Equestrian, Jumping Individual Competition
 Tom McBreen — Swimming, Men's 400 m Freestyle
 Doug Northway — Swimming, Men's 1500 m Freestyle
 John Murphy — Swimming, Men's 100 m Backstroke
 Mitch Ivey — Swimming, Men's 200 m Backstroke
 John Hencken — Swimming, Men's 100 m Breaststroke
 Jerry Heidenreich — Swimming, Men's 100 m Butterfly
 Robin Backhaus — Swimming, Men's 200 m Butterfly
 Steve Furniss — Swimming, Men's 200 m Individual Medley
 Keena Rothhammer — Swimming, Women's 200 m Freestyle
 Susie Atwood — Swimming, Women's 100 m Backstroke
 Ellie Daniel — Swimming, Women's 200 m Butterfly
 Lynn Vidali — Swimming, Women's 200 m Individual Medley
 Peter Asch, Steven Barnett, Bruce Bradley, Stanley Cole, James Ferguson, Eric Lindroth, John Parker, Gary Sheerer, James Slatton, Russell Webb, and Barry Weitzenberg — Water Polo, Men's Team Competition
 Chris Taylor — Wrestling, Men's Freestyle Super Heavyweight
 Donald Cohan, Charles Horter, and John Marshall — Sailing, Men's Dragon Team Competition
 Peter Dean and Glen Foster — Sailing, Men's Tempest Team Competition

Archery

In the first modern archery competition at the Olympics, the United States entered three men and three women.  They took home both of the gold medals as well as a pair of 5th-place finishes.

Athletics

Men
Road and track events

Field events

Combined event – Decathlon

Women
Track events

Field events

Combined event – Pentathlon

Basketball

Summary

Boxing

Canoeing

Slalom
Men

Women

Sprint
Men and Women

Key: QF - Qualified to medal final; SF - Qualified to semifinal; R - Qualified to repechage

Cycling

Fifteen cyclists represented the United States in 1972.

Road

Track
Pursuit

Sprint

Time trial

Diving

Men

Women

Equestrian

Dressage

Eventing

Jumping

Fencing

19 fencers represented the United States in 1972.

Individual
Men

Women

Team

Football

Summary

Team Roster
 Mike Ivanow (GK)
 Casey Bahr
 John Bocwinski
 Horst Stemke
 Neil Stam
 Archie Roboostoff
 Mike Seerey
 John Carenza
 Buzz Demling
 Manuel Hernandez
 Hugo Salcedo
 Al Trost
 Joe Hamm
 Steve Gay
 Shep Messing (GK)
 Wally Ziaja
 Mike Flater
 Mike Margulis
 Jim Zylker
 Coach: Bob Guelker

Gymnastics

Men
Team

Individual final

Women
Team

Individual finals

Handball

The United States, which had lost all three of its games in the first Olympic handball tournament, fared no better in the first round of the second tournament.  The Americans lost to Hungary, Yugoslavia, and Japan to finish last place in the division, sending them to the thirteenth- to sixteenth-place consolation round.  There, they finally got their first handball win over Spain before being defeated by Denmark.

Men's Team Competition:
 United States - 14th place (1-4-0)
 Roster - Richard Abrahamson, Fletcher Abram Jr., Roger Baker, Dennis Berkholtz, Larry Caton, Vincent DiCalogero, Elmer Edes, Thomas Hardiman, Rudolph Matthews, Sandor Rivnyak, James Rogers, Richard Schlesinger, Kevin Serrapede, Robert Sparks, Joel Voelkert, and Harry WinklerThomas Jandris)]

Judo

Men's Lightweight
Kenneth Okada

Men's Half-Middleweight
Patrick Burris

Men's Middleweight
Irwin Cohen

Men's Half-Heavyweight
James Wooley

Men's Heavyweight
Douglas Nelson

Men's Open Class
Johnny Watts

Modern pentathlon

Three pentathletes represented the United States in 1972.

Rowing

Qualification legend: FA = Final A (medal); FB = Final B (non-medal); SF = Semifinal; R = Repechage

Sailing

Shooting

Fourteen shooters represented the United States in 1972. Lones Wigger and John Writer won golds and Lanny Bassham and Vic Auer won silver medals.

Swimming

Men's 100m Freestyle
Mark Spitz
 Heat — 52.46s
 Semifinals — 52.43s
 Final — 51.22s (→  Gold medal)

Jerry Heidenreich
 Heat — 52.38s
 Semifinals — 52.31s
 Final — 51.65s (→  Silver medal)

John Murphy
 Heat — 53.07s
 Semifinals — 53.17s
 Final — 52.08s (→ 4th place)

Men's 200m Freestyle
Mark Spitz
 Heat — 1:55.29
 Final — 1:52.78 (→  Gold medal)

Steve Genter
 Heat — 1:55.42
 Final — 1:53.73 (→  Silver medal)

Fred Tyler
 Heat — 1:56.04
 Final — 1:54.96 (→ 5th place)

Men's 4 × 100 m Freestyle Relay
Dave Fairbank, Gary Conelly, Jerry Heidenreich, and David Edgar
 Heat — 3:28.84
David Edgar, John Murphy, Jerry Heidenreich, and Mark Spitz
 Final — 3:26.42 (→  Gold medal)

Men's 4 × 200 m Freestyle Relay
Gary Conelly, Tom McBreen, Michael Burton, and John Kinsella
 Heat — 8:03.98
John Kinsella, Fred Tyler, Steve Genter, and Mark Spitz
 Final — 7:35.78 (→  Gold medal)

Men's 4 × 100 m Medley Relay
Tom Bruce, Jerry Heidenreich, Mike Stamm, and Mark Spitz
 Final (→  Gold medal)

Water polo

Men's Team Competition
Preliminary Round (Group A)
 Defeated Romania (4-3)
 Defeated Cuba (7-6)
 Defeated Canada (8-1)
 Defeated Mexico (7-5)
 Defeated Yugoslavia (5-3)
Final round (Group I)
 Drew with West Germany (4-4)
 Lost to Hungary (3-5)
 Drew with Soviet Union (6-6)
 Defeated Italy (6-5) →  Bronze medal

Team Roster
 Peter Asch
 Steven Barnett
 Bruce Bradley
 Stanley Cole
 James Ferguson
 Eric Lindroth
 John Parker
 Gary Sheerer
 James Slatton
 Russell Webb
 Barry Weitzenberg

Weightlifting

Wrestling

Water skiing (demonstration sport)
Men's slalom:
 Wayne Grimditch - 38.5 points, silver medal
 Ricky McCormick - 27.5 points, 9th place

Men's Figure skiing:
 Ricky McCormick - 5340 points, gold medal
 Wayne Grimditch - 4510 points, silver medal

Men's Jump:
 Ricky McCormick - 43.75 points, gold medal
 Wayne Grimditch - 30.15 points, 14th place

Women's Slalom:
 Liz Allen-Shetter - 35.0 points, gold medal

Women's Figure skiing:
 Liz Allen-Shetter - 1550 points, 5th place

Women's Jump:
 Liz Allen-Shetter - 25.70 points, bronze medal

See also
United States at the 1971 Pan American Games
United States at the 1972 Summer Paralympics

References

Nations at the 1972 Summer Olympics
1972 Summer Olympics
Oly